Fader Berg i hornet stöter (Father Berg blows his horn) is Epistle No. 3 in the Swedish poet and performer Carl Michael Bellman's 1790 song collection, Fredman's Epistles. The epistle is subtitled "Till en och var av systrarna, men enkannerligen till Ulla Winblad" (To each and every one of the sisters, most especially to Ulla Winblad). One of his best-known works, it is both about and mimics the rhythm of playing the horn, while Fredman enjoys the sight of Ulla Winblad dancing in a ruffled dress.

Background

Epistle

Music and verse form 

The song has four stanzas, each of 11 lines, with a corno (horn) interlude before the first and fourth lines. It is in  time, marked Menuetto. The rhyming pattern is AABCCB-DDDEE.

The source of the melody is an unknown minuet; Epistle 4's melody can be seen from an early manuscript to be from the same source. Bellman.net states that a possible source melody is a minuet in a contemporary Danish musicians' book, but if so, Bellman's melody is so different that he is at least in part its composer.

Lyrics  

The epistle is one of the first that Bellman wrote, between March and May 1770; it introduces Ulla Winblad to the world. The lyrics portray and mimic the rhythm of playing the horn, while Fredman enjoys the sight of Ulla dancing in her ruffled dress. Bellman's biographer, Paul Britten Austin, writes that it perfectly captures the sound of a horn with its minuet melody, whereas No. 2's melody "is exactly a fiddler's". He remarks how different the two are "in style, tempo, rhythm, even instrumental tone-colour".

Reception and legacy 

Carina Burman writes in her biography of Bellman that the epistle illustrates the gently voyeuristic perspective with detailed observation of "white legs" and details of the nymphs' attire that Bellman delights in; the arch-nymph Ulla Winblad is introduced in this Epistle, which is dedicated to her.

Edvard Matz, author of a book about Bellman's women, calls the song "familiar to everyone", writing that it contains the well-known exclamations "Hurra! si Ulla dansar" ("Hooray! See Ulla's dancing") and "Ulla Winblad kära Syster, Du är eldig, qvick och yster, Hvar dag så står du brud." (Ulla Winblad dear sister, You are fiery, quick and frisky, Each day you stand as bride.")

The Epistle has been recorded by Fred Åkerström on his 1969 album Fred sjunger Bellman, where it was the first track.

Notes

References

Sources

 
 
 
 
  (contains the most popular Epistles and Songs, in Swedish, with sheet music)
  (with facsimiles of sheet music from first editions in 1790, 1791)

External links 

 Text of Epistle 3 on Bellman.net

Fredmans epistlar
18th-century songs